Kərəmli may refer to:
 Kərəmli, Goygol, Azerbaijan
 Kərəmli, Kalbajar, Azerbaijan